The 47th Assault Brigade (MUN A4699) is a heavy assault brigade of the Ukrainian Ground Forces created during the 2022 Russian invasion of Ukraine. Initially created as a volunteer battalion on April 26, 2022, the 47th was expanded into a regiment and re-designated as the 47th Assault Regiment. By November 15, the regiment was further expanded into a full assault brigade. By January 3, 2023, the 47th Assault Brigade was equipped with all twenty-eight M-55S main battle tanks that were provided by Slovenia, along with fifty M2 Bradley infantry fighting vehicles. The 47th is currently located in Kharkiv to help form a new defensive force consisting of three territorial defense brigades, a contingent of border guards, and the 40th Separate Artillery Brigade.

History 
After the start of the 2022 Russian invasion of Ukraine, deputy commander of a battalion in the 30th Separate Mechanized Brigade, Captain Ivan Shalamaga, was tasked with creating a separate battalion after preventing a Russian breakthrough on Svitlodarsk. Officially created on April 26, the 47th Separate Battalion trained before being deployed to the Vuglehirskaya area, near Bakhmut. After the Commander-in-Chief of the Ukrainian Armed Forces Valery Zaluzhny reviewed the combat reports, he gave the order to expand the battalion as a full assault regiment. Within three months, the battalion was successfully transformed into the 47th Assault Regiment.

While the regiment was training and obtaining weapons and equipment in the beginning of October, the order was given to the regiment's command to expand into a brigade, doing so in one month. With this, Oleksandr Sak was appointed as the brigade commander by General Zaluzhny, with commander Shalamaga becoming his deputy. As of January 2023, the brigade's personnel are in combat training at various locations throughout Ukraine and Europe. The 47th Assault Brigade is equipped with twenty-eight M-55S main battle tanks that were provided by Slovenia, and complemented with fifty M2 Bradley infantry fighting vehicles. Members of the brigade are training in a U.S. base in Grafenwoehr, Germany on the M2 Bradleys, while the tank units are based in Kharkiv and training on their M-55S tanks. The brigade currently has about 2,000 personnel, up from roughly 400 in April.

Current structure 
Current structure of the 47th Separate Assault Brigade:
 Headquarters and HQ Company
1st Mechanized Battalion
2nd Mechanized Battalion
3rd Mechanized Battalion
Tank Battalion
 Brigade Artillery Group
Group HQ and recon battery
Self-Propelled Artillery Battalion
Self-Propelled Artillery Battalion
Rocket artillery Battalion
Anti-Tank unit
Anti-Aircraft Battery
CBRN-Defense Company
Engineer Battalion
Logistics Battalion
Maintenance Battalion
Medical Company
Radar Company
Signal Company

References 

2022 establishments in Ukraine
Brigades of the Ukrainian Ground Forces
Military units and formations established in 2022